St Matthew's Church is a Church of England church in Chapel Allerton, Leeds described by Nikolaus Pevsner as a "noble and spacious building" with a "bold, sturdy tower".  The church has been Grade II* listed since 23 September 1963.

Location
The church is located on Wood Lane in Chapel Allerton.

History

The church was built between 1897 and 1898 to a design by George Frederick Bodley. replacing an earlier smaller church.  The church was built by Stephens and Baslow of Bristol with glass by Burlison and Grylls.  By 1935 the former church had fallen into a state of disrepair and was demolished.

Architectural style

Exterior
The church is of Bath stone and Ancaster stone ashlar.  The church has narrow buttresses and a crenellated tower with clock.

Interior
The church has three light windown set in recesses with quatrefoils.  The floor is stone flagged and the nave ceiling wooden tunnel-vaulted.  There is an organ situated on a mezzanine level at the east end of the north aisle.  There is a reredos of carved and gilded wood.

See also
List of places of worship in the City of Leeds

References

Further reading
 (History of the former chapel and the current building)
 (Mainly about the people and history of church activities)

Anglican Diocese of Leeds
Church of England church buildings in West Yorkshire
Grade II listed churches in West Yorkshire